Laurie Trok is a mixed media artist living in Pittsburgh, Pennsylvania. She worked with Brooklyn artist Isidro Blasco. She has shown at the Carnegie Museum of Art, Space Gallery, and has shown her work at the Westmoreland Museum of American Art. She has collaborated on community art projects in Pittsburgh. Trok's work was selected to highlight the lack of publicity of local women artists in the "Seen in Pittsburgh: Works on Paper by Women" by Graham Shearing. He hoped to "hand the curation of the show over to a rotating group of other curatorially minded individuals, preferably women."

The pieces have been described as resembling lace. The collages have depth due to them hanging by fine wire behind each other, existing in three or more planes constructed of and cut paper.  Other materials include window panes, vinyl, file folders, and other building supplies. and scrapped building supplies. Some of her work incorporates discarded windowpanes, with dimension achieved by the application of vinyl to both sides of the glass. The pieces are constructed to utilize lighting to emphasize the shadows cast by the cut outs.

References

Artists from Pittsburgh
American women artists
American art historians
Gender studies academics
Feminist artists
Duquesne University alumni
Year of birth missing (living people)
Living people
Historians from Pennsylvania
Women art historians
American women historians